Phosphatidylinositol (or Inositol Phospholipid) consists of a family of lipids as illustrated on the right, where red is x, blue is y, and black is z, in the context of independent variation, a class of the phosphatidylglycerides. In such molecules the isomer of the inositol group is assumed to be the myo- conformer unless otherwise stated. Typically phosphatidylinositols form a minor component on the cytosolic side of eukaryotic cell membranes. The phosphate group gives the molecules a negative charge at physiological pH.  

The form of phosphatidylinositol comprising the isomer muco-inositol acts as a sensory receptor in the taste function of the sensory system.  In this context it is often referred to as PtdIns, but that does not imply any molecular difference from phosphatidylinositols comprising the myo- conformers of inositol. 

The phosphatidylinositol can be phosphorylated to form phosphatidylinositol phosphate (PI-4-P, referred to as PIP in close context or informally), phosphatidylinositol bisphosphate (PIP2) and phosphatidylinositol trisphosphate (PIP3).  All lipids based on phosphatidylinositol are known as inositides, or sometimes phosphoinositides.

Biosynthesis

The synthesis of phosphatidylinositol in the laboratory is catalyzed by phosphatidylinositol synthase and involves CDP-diacylglycerol and L-myo-inositol.

Chemistry
PI has a polar and non-polar region, making the lipid an amphiphile. Phosphatidylinositol is classified as a glycerophospholipid that contains a glycerol backbone, two non-polar fatty acid tails, a phosphate group substituted with an inositol polar head group.

The most common fatty acids of phosphoinositides are stearic acid in the SN1 position and arachidonic acid, in the SN2 position. Hydrolysis of phosphoinositides yield one mole of glycerol, two moles of fatty acids, one mole of inositol and one, two, or three moles of phosphoric acids, depending on the number of phosphates on the inositol rings. Phosphoinositides are regarded as the most acidic phospholipids.

The specific fatty acids of PtdIns, and their conformation, employed in the sensory neurons has not been elucidated.

Phosphoinositides
Phosphorylated forms of phosphatidylinositol (PI) are called phosphoinositides and play important roles in lipid signaling, cell signaling and membrane trafficking. The inositol ring can be phosphorylated by a variety of kinases on the three, four and five hydroxyl groups in seven different combinations. However, the two and six hydroxyl groups are typically not phosphorylated due to steric hindrance.

All seven variations of the following phosphoinositides have been found in animals:

Phosphatidylinositol monophosphates:
 Phosphatidylinositol 3-phosphate, also known as PtdIns3P or PI(3)P
 Phosphatidylinositol 4-phosphate, also known as PtdIns4P or PI(4)P
 Phosphatidylinositol 5-phosphate, also known as PtdIns5P or PI(5)P

Phosphatidylinositol bisphosphates:
 Phosphatidylinositol 3,4-bisphosphate, also known as PtdIns(3,4)P2 or PI(3,4)P2
 Phosphatidylinositol 3,5-bisphosphate, also known as PtdIns(3,5)P2 or PI(3,5)P2
 Phosphatidylinositol 4,5-bisphosphate, also known as PtdIns(4,5)P2, PI(4,5)P2 or often simply referred to as PIP2

Phosphatidylinositol trisphosphate:
 Phosphatidylinositol 3,4,5-trisphosphate, also known as PtdIns(3,4,5)P3 or PI(3,4,5)P3

These phosphoinositides are also found in plant cells, with the exception of PIP3.

See also

 PI 3-kinase
 Inositol phosphate
 Phosphatidylinositol 3-phosphate
 Phosphatidylinositol 4-phosphate
 Phosphatidylinositol 5-phosphate
 Phosphatidylinositol (3,4)-bisphosphate
 Phosphatidylinositol (3,5)-bisphosphate
 Phosphatidylinositol (4,5)-bisphosphate
 Inositol 1,4,5-triphosphate
 Phosphatidylinositol (3,4,5)-trisphosphate
 inositol pentakisphosphate
 inositol hexaphosphate
 inositol triphosphate receptor

References

Additional images

External links
 
 Phosphatidylinositol at Lipid Library

Phospholipids
Membrane biology